Hoya de Buñol or Hoya de Buñol-Chiva is a comarca in the province of Valencia, Valencian Community, Spain.

Municipalities
Alborache
Buñol
Cheste
Chiva
Dos Aguas
Godelleta
Macastre
Siete Aguas
Yátova

 
Comarques of the Valencian Community
Geography of the Province of Valencia